Private Eric Anderson VC (15 September 19156 April 1943) was a British Army soldier and an English recipient of the Victoria Cross (VC), the highest and most prestigious award for gallantry in the face of the enemy that can be awarded to British and Commonwealth forces.

Early life
He was born in Fagley in Bradford, West Yorkshire, the only son of George and Mary Anderson. He became a driver for a building and contracting firm in Idle, West Yorkshire.

Service
Anderson was 27 years old, and a Private in the 5th Battalion, East Yorkshire Regiment, British Army during the Second World War when the following deed took place for which he was awarded the VC.

On 6 April 1943 on the Wadi Akarit, Tunisia, when a company of the East Yorkshire Regiment had to withdraw temporarily behind the crest of a hill, Private Anderson, a stretcher-bearer, went forward alone through heavy fire to rescue the wounded. Three times he brought in wounded comrades, and was rendering first aid to a fourth when he was mortally wounded.

He is buried in Sfax War Cemetery in southern Tunisia.
His Victoria Cross is displayed at The Prince of Wales Own Regiment of Yorkshire Museum in York.

See also
 List of Second World War Victoria Cross recipients

References

Further reading
 Harvey, David (1999). Monuments to Courage: Victoria Cross Headstones and Memorials. Vol. 1, 1854–1916
 Buzzell, Nora (1997), This England, 3rd Edn., 352pp,

External links
 Flickr images: Memorial to Eric Anderson and others at the Victoria Memorial, Bradford.

1915 births
1943 deaths
British World War II recipients of the Victoria Cross
Military personnel from Bradford
British Army personnel killed in World War II
East Yorkshire Regiment soldiers
British Army recipients of the Victoria Cross
Burials at Sfax War Cemetery
People from Bradford